Paul Kockelman is a professor of anthropology at Yale University. His work in linguistic anthropology includes the description and ethnographic analysis of Q’eqchi’, a Mayan language spoken in Guatemala. His contributions  to anthropological theory have covered a wide range of themes, including agency, temporality, meaning, subjectivity, stance, value, and more recently the Anthropocene. Some of these writings, blending the concerns of semiotics and ethnography with those of mathematics and computer science, have been understood to have pushed the frontiers of anthropological theory.  Kockelman has been described as "one of anthropology's last great system‐builders".

Kockelman has served as the editor-in-chief of the Journal of Linguistic Anthropology. He is also co-editor, with Nick Enfield and Jack Sidnell, of The Cambridge Handbook of Linguistic Anthropology.

References

External links
 Paul Kockelman, Yale University Department of Anthropology

Yale University faculty
Mayanists
American anthropologists
Linguistics journal editors
Year of birth missing (living people)
Living people